Nick Leavey (born 27 August 1986) is a British sprint athlete.

Achievements

References

1986 births
Living people
British male sprinters
Athletes (track and field) at the 2010 Commonwealth Games
Commonwealth Games bronze medallists for England
Commonwealth Games medallists in athletics
21st-century British people
Medallists at the 2010 Commonwealth Games